Peabody Veterans Memorial High School (PVMHS), also known as Peabody High School, is a comprehensive and competitive public high school in Peabody, Massachusetts, United States. It is the only comprehensive public high school in the Peabody School District, spanning grades 9–12 in the U.S. education system. It is particularly known for its performing arts program including its a D1 athletic program instrumental and choral ensembles and drama club.

Academics
The school's academic departments include AFJROTC, Business, Career and Technical Education, English, World Languages/ELL, Wellness, Mathematics, Performing Arts, Science, Social Studies, Special Education, and Visual Arts.

The Air ForceJunior Reserve Officers' Training Corps (AFJROTC) program is a military-based set of courses for students interested in pursuing a military career.

The Career and Technical Education Program has five approved career pathway programs: Cosmetology, Culinary Arts, Early Childhood Education, Electronics and Engineering, and Medical Assisting.

The Peabody Community School Program is a separate special education day school operated by PVMHS that assists students with emotional, behavioral, and learning disabilities. The school is a therapeutic environment with extensive differentiation, small classes, and focused behavioral programs.

Student Health Center

In 2015, North Shore Community Health opened up a school-based health center at PVMHS. The health center helps students with behavioral and medical health. 
Students are able to seek medical attention in a calm and comforting atmosphere.

Peabody Youth Advisory Council

The council advocates for easier access to health services. The group makes an annual trip to the Massachusetts State House in Boston, to speak with state politicians to increase the number of school health centers in the state and country. Students in the Youth Advisory Council represent Peabody at the School-based Health Conference, where students work with peers from across the country to promote healthier lifestyles and choices while also increasing awareness for many public health issues.

Extracurricular activities

Theater program 
The theater program, Stage One, was founded in 1970 by Father Frank Toste, a Catholic priest and member of the Congregation of Holy Cross. Stage One has placed in the top three at the Massachusetts High School Theater Festival, run annually by the Massachusetts Educational Theater Guild five times: Equus in 1983, La Bête in 1997, Alchemy of Desire / Dead Man's Blues in 2012, Eurydice in 2015, and The Long Christmas Ride Home in 2016. The company puts on three shows a year: a fall show, a Festival home show which competes at the High School Theater Festival, and a spring musical.

Music programs 
Chorale and mixed chorus participate in the Massachusetts Instrumental and Choral Conductors Association (MICCA) Festival.  Chorale also conducts four singing talent shows per year.

PVMHS also has an a cappella group, Full House.

Demographics
The reported racial makeup is 76.5% White, 15.9% Hispanic, 3.4%  African American, 2.2% Asian/American Indian, 2.0% multiracial (non-Hispanic), and 0% Native Hawaiian, Native American, and Pacific Islander.

For assessment of selected populations, the reported statistics are 43.9% high needs, 28.7% economically disadvantaged, 19.7% students with disabilities, 7.0% students with their first language being non-English, and 3.8% English language learner.

Ratings
The Massachusetts Department of Education School and District Accountability program to assess overall performance rated the school as "among lowest performing 20% of schools" in 2017.

Notable alumni

 Jeff Allison, baseball player, instructor, and coach (minor league 2003–2011)
 Samantha Arsenault, swimmer (gold medal in women's 4×200-meter freestyle relay at the 2000 Summer Olympics)
 Matt Bloom, professional wrestler, commentator, and trainer (wrestling professionally 1997–2014)
Kimberly S. Budd, Chief Justice of the Massachusetts Supreme Judicial Court
 Gary Gulman, comedian
 Steve Lomasney, baseball player (signed in 1995, one major league game in 1999, minor league until 2006)
 Heather MacLean, runner who competed at 2020 Summer Olympics
Nicholas Mavroules, mayor from 1967 to 1978, congressman 1979 to 1993
 Patricia Goldman-Rakic, pioneering neuroscientist and professor
Ruth Shoer Rappaport, scientist and vaccine researcher 
 John Tudor, baseball player (major league 1979–1990)
 Nancy Werlin, author of young-adult novels (published works 1994–present)

Notable alumni of public high school in Peabody prior to the establishment of the current PVMHS in 1970 include the National Football League players Tom Alberghini (NFL 1945) and Jerry DeLucca (NFL 1959–1964).

References

Public high schools in Massachusetts
Peabody, Massachusetts
Schools in Essex County, Massachusetts
Northeastern Conference
1850 establishments in Massachusetts